Muisca cylindricollis is a species of checkered beetles of the genus Muisca in the subfamily of Clerinae or Enopliinae. It was first described by zoologist Adriano Lúcio Peracchi in 1962 as Cregya cylindricollis. The same author reclassified the species as Paracregya cylindricollis in 1964. Paracregya cylindricollis was reclassified as Muisca cylindricollis by Ekis in 1975. The genus is named after the Muisca from the Altiplano Cundiboyacense in central Colombia.

See also 

 List of flora and fauna named after the Muisca

References

Bibliography 
 

Cleridae
Endemic fauna of Brazil
Invertebrates of Brazil
Muysccubun
Beetles described in 1962